Christian Sabatié (born 20 June 1941) is a French former rugby league footballer who played in the 1960s and 1970s, as a .

Background
Christian Sabatié was born in Allez-et-Cazeneuve, France. His son, Pierre Sabatié, is also a former French rugby league international.

Playing career 
He played for Villeneuve-sur-Lot, with which he won a historic treble. He also was called up for France national team, with which he played the 1968 Rugby League World Cup final lost against Australia. Outside the sport, he worked as a mechanic.

Honours 

 Rugby league :
 World Cup :
 1 time runner-up in 1968 (France).
 French Championship :
 1-time winner in 1964 (Villeneuve-sur-Lot).
 2 times finalist in 1962 and 1965 (Villeneuve-sur-Lot).
 Lord Derby Cup :
 5 times finalist in 1964, 1966, 1969, 1970 and 1972 (Villeneuve-sur-Lot).

International caps

Cap details

References 

1941 births
Living people
France national rugby league team captains
France national rugby league team players
French rugby league players
Rugby league props
Sportspeople from Lot-et-Garonne
Villeneuve Leopards players